New Pine Creek may refer to:
New Pine Creek, California
New Pine Creek, Oregon